Nancy McCormick may refer to:

Nancy Lay-McCormick
Nancy McCormick Rambusch